Oregon Ballot Measure 102 was a ballot measure passed by voters in the November 6, 2018 general election. If passed, the measure "would allow local governments to issue bonds to pay for affordable housing projects that involve nonprofits or other nongovernmental entities".

The Oregon state legislature voted to put the measure on the ballot for voter approval and it received broad bipartisan support during the election, including from both major party candidates in the 2018 Oregon gubernatorial election, Democrat Kate Brown and then-Republican Knute Buehler. The measure also had the support of vocal opponents of an affordable housing bond that was put before Portland-area voters in the same election. It faced no major organized opposition.

Early results from election night showed that the measure passed easily, and the official results later published by the Oregon Secretary of State showed that the measure passed with 56.90% of the vote.

References

102